Joseph Thomas Mitchell (1 January 1886 – 1964) was an English footballer who played in the Football League for Chesterfield, Coventry City, Sheffield United and South Shields.

References

1886 births
1964 deaths
English footballers
Association football forwards
English Football League players
Thorpe Hesley F.C. players
Sheffield United F.C. players
Luton Town F.C. players
Gateshead A.F.C. players
Coventry City F.C. players
Chesterfield F.C. players
Barnsley F.C. players
Denaby United F.C. players
Eckington Works F.C. players